Errol Alexander McNally (27 August 1943 – 15 May 2017) was a Northern Irish professional footballer who played as a goalkeeper.

Club career
McNally moved to England to sign for Chelsea in December 1961 after impressing with his performances for Portadown. He made nine appearances before returning to Northern Ireland to sign for Glenavon.

Death
McNally died on 15 May 2017 and was buried in Magheradroll Parish Church, Ballynahinch.

References

1943 births
2017 deaths
People from Lurgan
Association footballers from Northern Ireland
Association football goalkeepers
Portadown F.C. players
Chelsea F.C. players
Glenavon F.C. players